William Corwin Stuart (April 28, 1920 – August 12, 2010) was an American attorney, politician, and jurist who served as a justice of the Iowa Supreme Court, and United States district judge of the United States District Court for the Southern District of Iowa.

Early life and education

Born in Knoxville, Iowa, Stuart received a Bachelor of Arts degree from the University of Iowa in 1941, followed by a Juris Doctor from the University of Iowa College of Law in 1942. He was a Lieutenant in the United States Naval Air Corps during World War II, serving from 1943 to 1945.

Career 
Stuart operated a private legal practice in Chariton, Iowa from 1946 to 1962, serving as a city attorney of Chariton from 1947 to 1949. He was a member of the Iowa Senate from 1953 to 1961. He became a justice of the Iowa Supreme Court on October 15, 1962, serving until he resigned November 8, 1971, following his appointment to the federal bench.

On October 13, 1971, Stuart was nominated by President Richard Nixon to a seat on the United States District Court for the Southern District of Iowa vacated by Judge Roy Laverne Stephenson. Stuart was confirmed by the United States Senate on October 28, 1971, and received his commission on November 1, 1971. He served as Chief Judge from 1977 to 1985, assuming senior status on April 30, 1986.

Death 
Stuart died in Chariton on August 12, 2010 at the age of 90.

References

Sources
 
 

1920 births
2010 deaths
Iowa state senators
Justices of the Iowa Supreme Court
Judges of the United States District Court for the Southern District of Iowa
United States district court judges appointed by Richard Nixon
20th-century American judges
University of Iowa alumni
University of Iowa College of Law alumni
People from Knoxville, Iowa
United States Navy personnel of World War II
United States Navy officers
People from Chariton, Iowa